Duxford Preceptory was a preceptory in Cambridgeshire, England. It was established in 1273.

References

Monasteries in Cambridgeshire
1273 establishments in England
Christian monasteries established in the 13th century